The Tengku Ampuan Rahimah (TAR) Hospital in Klang (Malay: Hospital Besar Tengku Ampuan Rahimah, Klang), also known as Klang General Hospital or Klang GH is a 1094-bed government tertiary hospital located in the south of the royal town of Klang, Selangor, Malaysia. The hospital is the second busiest hospital in Malaysia in terms of inpatients admission and the busiest outpatient medical facility in Malaysia.

This hospital provides primary and selected tertiary care services. The hospital began operations in 1985 and is located not far from Istana Alam Shah and Bandar Bukit Tinggi. It was named after the consort of Sultan Salahuddin, Tengku Ampuan Rahimah.

Hospital Information 
The Tengku Ampuan Rahimah (TAR) General Hospital is a 28-ward Malaysian government medical facility with over 850 inpatients beds and 20 clinical disciplines. It has a monthly average of 10,000 patients and a daily average of 20 elective surgeries.

The Klang TAR Hospital is also a referral hospital for many district hospitals and health clinics ranging from Kuala Langat in the south up to Kuala Selangor in the north. It was awarded the MS ISO 9002 Quality System certification in 1998.

This hospital also focuses on ambulatory services and is equipped with a helipad for emergency evacuation purposes. The Klang TAR Hospital also houses an in-situ medical teaching facility for the medical students of University of Malaya and Management and Science University.

In 2014, the hospital recorded 95,000 inpatients, the second highest in the country after Kuala Lumpur Hospital. The hospital serves a population catchment of 1.2 million.

The hospital has 4,025 staff in 2016.

Gallery

Access

Rail and bus
The hospital is accessible via the following 96 Seranas, Wawasan Sutera and Smart Selangor bus services. Stations serving the hospital are located at both sides of Jalan Langat.

 Klang ⇌ Bandar Bukit Tinggi.
 Banting ⇌ HAB Pasar Seni.
 Banting ⇌ Klang.
 SJKC Kong Hoe ↺ HTAR.

The hospital will be connected to  LRT Shah Alam line by  Sri Andalas LRT station which is located approximately 400 meters from the main entrance. The Shah Alam line is expected to begin operations in February 2024.

Issues

Overcrowded
The hospital is currently facing overcrowding issues, with too many patients and lack of space. Patients are being treated on beds placed along the corridors. TAR has 893 beds, with an admission rate of 260 patients daily. In 2014, the hospital recorded 95,000 inpatients, the second highest in the country.

Flash flood
A section of geriatric ward of the hospital is frequently flooded during heavy downpour. The hospital management has proposed to build a retention pond to overcome the issue to the State Public Works Department, Drainage and Irrigation Department and Health Department in February 2015.

References

External links 

 Official website of the Tengku Ampuan Rahimah (TAR) General Hospital, Klang
 Clinical Research Centre, Hospital Tengku Ampuan Rahimah (CRC HTAR)
 Klang District Health Office
 Ministry of Health, Malaysia

Hospital buildings completed in 1985
Hospitals in Selangor
Teaching hospitals in Malaysia
Hospitals established in 1985
1985 establishments in Malaysia
Klang (city)